The Verse of al-Tablīgh refers to verse of 5:67 of the Islam's central religious text, the Quran, which reads

Among various Sunni views, one relates this verse to Muhammad's criticism of the Jews and Christians. In Shia Islam, however, this verse is linked to Muhammad's announcement at the Ghadir Khumm in 632 CE about his cousin and son-in-law Ali, which in Shia signifies the divine investiture of Ali with the spiritual authority over Muslims. A few Sunni authors have similarly linked this verse with the merits of Ali.

Background

Farewell Pilgrimage 
Shortly before his death in 632 CE, Muhammad performed the Hajj ritual in Mecca, which has become known as his Farewell Pilgrimage. In his sermon in Mecca (at Arafat) and again later at the Ghadir Khumm by some accounts, he alerted Muslims about his impending death. On his return trip to Medina after the Hajj, Muhammad called the Muslim caravan to a halt at the Ghadir Khumm ahead of the noon congregational prayer, before the pilgrims parted to go their separate ways.

Ghadir Khumm 

After the prayer, Muhammad gave a sermon in which he declared, "Anyone who has me as his mawla, has this Ali as his ," as reported by some canonical Sunni and Shia sources, such as Musnad Ibn Hanbal and al-Ghadir.

Interpretations 

While the authenticity of the Ghadir Khumm is rarely contested, its interpretation is a source of controversy between Sunni and Shia. In particular, the interpretation of the Arabic word  tends to be split along sectarian lines in the context of this hadith. Sunni authors argue that Muhammad did not explicitly refer to Ali as his successor in the sermon, while the Shia Amini enumerates the Sunni sources that corroborate the Shia interpretation in the eleven volumes of al-Ghadir.

Sunni view 
Sunni scholars proffer various theories about the Verse of Tabligh. Possibly because the verse is placed in the context of a critical discussion of the People of the Book (adherents of earlier monotheistic faiths), some Sunni authors conclude that Muhammad was hesitant to convey this criticism. Al-Zamakhshari suggests that the verse equates concealing any part of the revelations with concealing all of it and includes a tradition that threatens Muhammad with God's punishment in that case. Muhammad's wife Aisha is said to have considered this verse as evidence that Muhammad did not withhold any of the revelations. 

The promised protection in this verse has also led some to conclude that Muhammad at times feared the reaction to his messages. A Sunni tradition alleges that Muhammad hid parts of the revelations in Mecca but was ordered by this verse to reveal them when the Muslim community strengthened. Yet other reports claim that Muhammad had bodyguards until the Verse of Tabligh assured his safety. Some other reports by al-Tabari and al-Qurtubi link this verse to the story of a Bedouin Arab who reportedly attempted to kill an unguarded Muhammad, though a similar explanation is also given for verse 5:11. 

A few Sunni authors link this verse to the spiritual merits of Ali and the Ghadir Khumm, while some others link this verse to Muhammad's sermon at Arafat a few days before the Ghadir Khumm. Similar to the Shia, these authors thus associate the Verse of Tabligh with the final directives issued by Muhammad. Nasr and his coauthors view as most plausible a link between the Verse of Tabligh and the events that followed the Farewell Pilgrimage, including the Ghadir Khumm. Their justification is that chapter five of the Quran is often associated with Muhammad's final years in Medina, while verses 1-11 of this  are specifically linked to the Farewell Pilgrimage by many.

Shia view  
Shia traditions relate the Verse of Tabligh to the Ghadir Khumm, suggesting that Muhammad was concerned about implementing his divine instructions to make the announcement about Ali, fearing the reaction of some of his companions. It was only after the revelation of this verse that Muhammad gave his sermon at the Ghadir Khumm, according to these sources.  

Supporting the Shia interpretation, Tabatabai notes that the Verse of Tabligh apparently refers to an announcement without which the prophetic mission would have failed. The verse also suggests that Muhammad had delayed that announcement, perhaps fearing opposition and awaiting suitable circumstances, until his safety was assured. As such, this matter could have not been a regular religious injunction because withholding that could not have destructed Islam. Nor did Muhammad fear anyone in preaching the Islamic injunctions. For Tabatabai, this all adds weight to the Shia traditions that link the Verse of Tabligh to the Ghadir Khumm and the divine investiture of Ali with spiritual authority over Muslims.

See also

Notes

Sources 
 
 

 
 
 
 
 
 
 
 
 

Quranic verses